General is a Malayalam language newspaper printed daily and published from the City of Thrissur, Kerala in India.

Editions
 City of Thrissur
 Online

Timeline
 1976 "General" founded
 1976 First issue of General was published on 21 May

See also
 List of newspapers in India by circulation
 List of newspapers in the world by circulation

References

External links
  https://web.archive.org/web/20101225234022/http://malayalamnewspaper.net/
 General e-Paper (Registration may be required)

Mass media in Thrissur
Mass media in Kerala
Malayalam-language newspapers
Daily newspapers published in India
1976 establishments in Kerala
Publications established in 1976

ar:جنرال
fr:General